Swaroop may refer to:

Given name

Shanti Swaroop Bhatnagar OBE, FRS (1894–1955), Indian scientist and professor of chemistry
Justice Kishan Swaroop Chaudhari, B.Com. LLB., former Justice of Rajasthan High Court of India
Shanti Swaroop Dhavan (1905–1978), jurist, diplomat and Governor of West Bengal
Swaroop Kanchi (born 1983), Indian film director, producer and screenwriter
Air Chief Marshal Swaroop Krishna Kaul (born 1935), Chief of Air Staff (India) between 1993 and 1995
Swaroop Khan, Indian folk singer from Rajasthan, competitor in Indian Idol
Swaroop Kishen (1930–1992), Indian Test cricket umpire
Swaroop Philip, Indian cinematographer best in Malayalam cinema
Shanti Swaroop Rana, Indian military officer
P. Swaroop Reddy (born 1949), Indian judge
Swaroop Sampat (born 1958), Indian actress in several Hindi language films
Ram Swaroop Sharma (born 1958), politician from Jogindernagar, Himachal Pradesh, India
Ram Swaroop Singh, Samajwadi Party politician
Swaroop Singh (1917–2003), Indian academic turned politician

Surname
Anand Swaroop (born 1941), Indian former cricketer
Chitranjan Swaroop (1946–2015), Indian politician on Uttar Pradesh of India
Jyoti Swaroop, Indian film director, screenwriter and producer
Kamal Swaroop, film, television and radio director and screenwriter
Manjula Swaroop (born 1970), Indian film producer and actress in Telugu Cinema
R. A. Swaroop (born 1965), Indian former first-class cricketer
Shikha Swaroop (born 1970), Indian actress, and a former Miss India winner
Shiva Swaroop, Indian Police Officer and Former Director General of Central Reserve Police Force

Geography
Imaliya Swaroop, village in the Bhopal district of Madhya Pradesh, India

See also
Swaroopam

